Francis Fuller may refer to:

Francis Fuller the Elder (c. 1637–1701), English nonconformist minister
Francis Fuller the Younger (1670–1706), English medical writer
Francis Fuller (British Army officer) (died 1748)
Francis Charles Fuller (1866–1944), chief commissioner to the Ashanti Empire
Francis Fuller, surveyor and railway entrepreneur, father of the feminist and socialist activist Dora Montefiore

See also
Frank Fuller (disambiguation)
Frances Fuller (disambiguation)